Charles Bratton Snelling (September 21, 1886 – December 12, 1957) was a Canadian amateur ice hockey centre forward, football player and paddler, primarily active during the first decade of the 1900s. He played ice hockey primarily with the Ottawa New Edinburghs team of the Ottawa City Hockey League and the Interprovincial Amateur Hockey Union, but also one game (scoring three goals) for the Ottawa Hockey Club during the 1907 ECAHA season.

Snelling was the leading goal scorer of the Ottawa City Hockey League in 1910, playing on a forward line alongside future Hockey Hall of Fame defenceman Eddie Gerard (then a winger), with the February 11, 1910 issue of the Ottawa Citizen describing Snelling as "being particularly effective round the nets of the opposing teams."

References

1886 births
1957 deaths
Canadian ice hockey centres
Ice hockey people from Ottawa
Ottawa Senators (original) players